Hor Namhong   (born 15 November 1935) is a Cambodian diplomat who served in the government of Cambodia as Minister of Foreign Affairs from 1990 to 1993 and again from 1998 to 2016. He is a member of the Cambodian People's Party and has been a Deputy Prime Minister since 2004. He served as Cambodia's foreign minister for a combined tenure of 20 years.

Early life and education
Born at Phnom Penh, Hor Namhong was educated at the École royale d'administration (diplomatic section) in Cambodia.  He holds a Master of Law degree from the Faculty of Law in Paris and a diploma from the European Institute of High International Studies in France.

Early career
Between 1967 and 1973 Hor Namhong served at the Embassy of Cambodia in Paris, which became the mission of the exiled Royal Government of National Union of Kampuchea (GRUNK) in 1970. Between 1973 and 1975 he represented Cambodia as ambassador to Cuba.

Boeng Trabek prison camp
Between 1975 and 1979 Hor Namhong claims to have been a prisoner of the Khmer Rouge at Boeng Trabek. There have been accusations that he collaborated with his captors but Hor Namhong denies the accusations and was successful in a defamation suit against his accusers. On April 27, 2011, Hor Namhong lost a defamation suit in the French Supreme Court in which he claimed he was innocent of atrocities committed during the Khmer Rouge regime from 1975 through 1979.

In July 2011 Namhong lodged a protest with United States officials regarding a diplomatic cable released by WikiLeaks. The undated cable claimed that Namhong "became head of the Beng Trabek (sic) camp and he and his wife collaborated in the killing of many prisoners."

Subsequent career
 
In 1980, following the fall of the Khmer Rouge, Hor Namhong joined the government as Vice Minister of Foreign Affairs. In 1982 he was appointed as ambassador to the Soviet Union, a post which he held until 1989. In 1989 he returned to Cambodia as Minister of the Council of Ministers in charge of Foreign Affairs. In 1990 he was appointed Minister of Foreign Affairs and in 1991 became a member of the Supreme National Council of Cambodia.

Between 1987 and 1991 Hor Namhong was one of the key negotiators in the peace talks to end the "Cambodia Conflict". In October 1991 he was a signatory of the Paris Peace Agreement.

In 1993 he returned to the diplomatic corps as ambassador to France. In 1998 he returned to government as a Member of the National Assembly and Minister of Foreign Affairs and International Cooperation. In 2004, in addition to his position as foreign minister, he was appointed a deputy prime minister.

He retired from his post as foreign minister on 4 April 2016 after 17 years in office, though remained as a deputy prime minister. He was the longest serving Cambodian foreign minister.

Personal life
Hor Namhong is married, having five children. His eldest son, Hor Sothoun, is Permanent Secretary General of the Ministry of Foreign Affairs and International Cooperation and his two other sons serve as ambassadors: Hor Nambora as Ambassador to the United Kingdom and Hor Monirath as Ambassador to Japan (current Secretary of State of the Ministry of Tourism).

Awards

National

  Grand Cross of the Royal Order of Cambodia
  Grand Officer of the Royal Order of Monisaraphon

Foreign

  Grand Officer of the National Ordre du Mérite (France)
  Grand Cross of the Most Exalted Order of the White Elephant (Thailand)

References

|-
 

1935 births
Living people
Cambodian Buddhists
People from Phnom Penh
Cambodian diplomats
20th-century Cambodian politicians
21st-century Cambodian politicians
Cambodian politicians of Chinese descent
Members of the National Assembly (Cambodia)
Grand Officers of the Ordre national du Mérite
Knights Grand Cross of the Royal Order of Cambodia
Cambodian People's Party politicians
Deputy Prime Ministers of Cambodia
Government ministers of Cambodia
Foreign ministers of Cambodia
Ambassadors of Cambodia to Cuba
Ambassadors of Cambodia to the Soviet Union
Ambassadors of Cambodia to France
Cambodian expatriates in France
University of Paris alumni
Members of the Royal Order of Monisaraphon